Vishwanathganj is a constituency of the Uttar Pradesh Legislative Assembly covering the city of Vishwanathganj in the Pratapgarh district of Uttar Pradesh, India.

Vishwanathganj is one of five assembly constituencies in the Pratapgarh Lok Sabha constituency. Since 2008, this assembly constituency is numbered 247 amongst 403 constituencies.

Election results

2022

2017
Apna Dal (Sonelal) candidate Rakesh Kumar Verma won in 2017 Uttar Pradesh Legislative Elections defeating INC candidate Sanjay Pandey by a margin of 23,358 votes.

References

External links
 

Assembly constituencies of Uttar Pradesh
Pratapgarh district, Uttar Pradesh